Cravo Norte is a town and municipality in the Arauca Department, Colombia. It is thought to have been founded in 1538 by the Jesuit missionary Joseph Gumilla. The first census was conducted in May 1797 and counted a population of 205.

Climate
Cravo Norte has a tropical monsoon climate (Köppen Am) with little rainfall from December to March and heavy to very heavy rainfall from April to November.

References

Municipalities of Arauca Department